A tax collector (also called a taxman) is a person who collects unpaid taxes from other people or corporations. The term could also be applied to those who audit tax returns. Tax collectors are often portrayed as being evil, and in the modern world share a similar stereotype to that of lawyers.

History

Tax collectors in the Bible
Tax collectors, also known as publicans, are mentioned many times in the Bible (mainly in the New Testament). They were reviled by the Jews of Jesus' day because of their perceived greed and collaboration with the Roman occupiers. Tax collectors amassed personal wealth by demanding tax payments in excess of what Rome levied and keeping the difference. They worked for tax farmers. In the Gospel of Luke, Jesus sympathizes with the tax collector Zacchaeus, causing outrage from the crowds that Jesus would rather be the guest of a sinner than of a more respectable or "righteous" person. Matthew the Apostle in the New Testament was a tax collector.

Other historical tax collectors
 Simon Affleck
 Jacob Gaón
 Antoine Lavoisier

Modern tax collection agencies
National tax collection agencies include. inter alia, the Canada Revenue Agency, the Internal Revenue Service (IRS) in the United States, HM Revenue and Customs (HMRC) in the UK (merged from Inland Revenue and Her Majesty's Customs and Excise), Tax Administration Service (Spanish: Servicio de Administración Tributaria, SAT) in Mexico, the Australian Taxation Office, the Federal Public Finance Department (French : SPF Finances) in Belgium or the Direction Générale des Finances Publiques (DGFiP) in France.

Examples
 Catchpole
 District magistrate

References

Further reading

 
Government occupations
Tax occupations